Ngụy Văn Thà (16 January 1943 - 19 January 1974) was a Republic of Vietnam (South Vietnam) naval officer. He was commanding officer of the corvette RVNS Nhật Tảo (HQ-10) during the Battle of the Paracel Islands and was killed when a Chinese missile hit the HQ-10's bridge.

References

1943 births
1974 deaths